The men's 50 metre freestyle event at the 2008 Summer Olympics took place on 14–16 August at the Beijing National Aquatics Center in Beijing, China.

César Cielo made an Olympic milestone to become Brazil's first ever gold medalist in swimming. He rocketed to an unexpected triumph in a new Olympic record of 21.30, then the second-fastest in history, powering past the field by 0.15 of a second, a sizable chunk in Olympic swimming's shortest race. The French tandem of Amaury Leveaux and Alain Bernard took home the silver and bronze with respective times of 21.45 and 21.49.

Australia's Ashley Callus finished fourth in 21.62, while his teammate and world record holder Eamon Sullivan was a fraction behind the leading pack in sixth at 21.65. For the first time in Olympic history, no American swimmer had reached the podium in the event, as the reigning world champion Ben Wildman-Tobriner, swimming on the outside in lane eight, pulled off a fifth-place effort in 21.64. Competing at their third Olympics, South Africa's Roland Mark Schoeman (21.67) and Sweden's Stefan Nystrand (21.72) rounded out the finale in seventh and eighth place, respectively.

Earlier in the prelims, Cielo posted a time of 21.47 to erase Alexander Popov's 1992 Olympic record by 0.44 of a second. One heat later, Leveaux established the same record by winning the twelfth heat in 21.46. The following morning, in the semifinals, Cielo lowered again an Olympic record to 21.34 that had been set by Leveaux in the preliminaries under 0.12 seconds.

Records
Prior to this competition, the existing world and Olympic records were as follows.

The following Olympic records were set during this competition.

Qualification

The A standard for the event was 22.35 seconds. Up to two swimmers per National Olympic Committee (NOC) could qualify by swimming that time at an approved qualification event. The B standard was 23.13 seconds. Up to one swimmer per NOC meeting that time could qualify. NOCs without a male swimmer qualified in any event could also use their universality place.

Competition format

The competition consisted of three rounds: heats, semifinals, and a final. The swimmers with the best 16 times in the heats advanced to the semifinals. The swimmers with the best 8 times in the semifinals advanced to the final. Swim-offs were used as necessary to break ties for advancement to the next round.

Results

Heats

The swimmers with the top 16 times, regardless of heat, advanced to the semifinals.

Semifinals

The swimmers with the top 8 times, regardless of heat, advanced to the final.

Final

References

External links
Official Olympic Report

Men's freestyle 0050 metre
Men's events at the 2008 Summer Olympics